Ayanathathanur is a village located in the Sendurai taluk of Ariyalur district, Tamil Nadu, India.

Demographics 

As per the 2001 census, Ayanathathanur had a total population of 3411 with 1748 males and 1663 females.

References 

Villages in Ariyalur district